Perra has its origins in the countries of Spain, France and Italy. With a few exceptions, hereditary surnames—the surnames passed down through the male family lines—didn't exist until about 1000 years ago. The etymology of a surname is usually not the way the name is spelled today, given it was not unusual for a last name to be altered as an ancestor entered a new country.

In its original form in Spain the name is spelled Perra, pronounced with a rolling “R” and the “A” is loud on the end. Perra is thought to be the name of a lost place is Spain. The name Perra is also derived from the words stubbornness, pig-headedness, in Spanish, and also means leg, or thigh in the same language. Perra also perhaps is from the Latin perna, which means leg.

Perras as a French surname means rock or stone in French. This name is a good example of the name changing over time. Perras started out as Perra in France, then grows to Perras, then Perras de Fontaine, then as at least one leg of this family migrates to Canada where the family drops the de Fontaine and only uses Perras.

Notable a French people with the surname include:

Anita Perras (born 1960), Canadian country music singer
Dominique Perras (born 1974), Canadian cyclist
Fizalam-William Perras (1876–1936), Canadian politician
Margherita Perras (1908–1984), Greek soprano
Mike Perras (born 1963), Canadian DJ
Scott Perras (born 1983), Canadian biathlete

In Italy the surname also begins with Perra in the area of Sardinia then spreads out from there. Today the majority of the population with the surname Perra still resides in Sardinia.

References

de:Perras